1 of 1 may refer to:

 "1 of 1", a 2016 song by Tyga
 1 of 1 (Shinee album), 2016 and the title track
 1 of 1 (Sech album), 2020